Cecil Noel Sheridan (12 December 1936 – 12 July 2006) was an Irish painter, performance artist, installation artist and actor. He was a member of Aosdána, an elite Irish association of artists.

Early life
Sheridan was born in Dublin in 1936. His father was Cecil Brinsley Sheridan, a noted comic actor and panto dame at the Olympia Theatre, Dublin. Noel attended Synge Street CBS and worked for the Irish Independent; he studied for a Bachelor of Communications at Trinity College at night, and began to perform with the Trinity Players.

Career

He was also an amateur artist, painting abstract landscapes, his work appearing from 1958 in the annual exhibitions of Living Art and at the Paris Biennale in 1960; he represented Ireland at the 1962 UNESCO Convention of young painters in Paris and won the Carroll Prize for Painting in 1965 and 1969.

Sheridan worked as a gallery attendant in the Museum of Modern Art (New York), painting by night, and got a scholarship for Columbia University in 1967 for a masters in fine art.

He was from 1980 to 2002 director of the National College of Art and Design (NCAD, Dublin). He was also a committee member of Rosc and was elected to Aosdána.

Sheridan also worked in Australia for many years, and was Director of the Experimental Art Foundation in Adelaide from 1975 to 1980 and won the emeritus medal of the Australia Council for the Arts in 1994.

Personal life

Sheridan was married to Liz Murphy; they had 5 children. He died in 2006. Paul Durcan wrote a poem in his honour after his death.

References

External links

Irish male painters
Aosdána members
Painters from Dublin (city)
Alumni of Trinity College Dublin
Columbia University alumni
Columbia University School of the Arts alumni
Irish landscape painters
2006 deaths
1936 births